Ted Weschler (born May 16, 1962) is a former hedge fund manager and current investment manager at Berkshire Hathaway. Alongside Todd Combs, he is frequently cited as a potential future Chief Investment Officer of Berkshire.

Early life and education 
Ted Weschler was born in Buffalo, New York, and spent much of his childhood in Erie, Pennsylvania. Due to his father’s position as an executive of the A&P, the family moved often, largely locating in cities throughout the Rust Belt.  He attended high school at Cathedral Preparatory School in Erie. He is a 1983 graduate of the Wharton School of Business at the University of Pennsylvania, earning his bachelor's degree in economics with concentrations in finance and accounting.

Career
After graduating from Wharton, Weschler worked for six years at W. R. Grace and Company, an American chemical conglomerate. In 1989 he left Grace and for the next ten years was a partner in Quad-C Management, a private equity firm in Charlottesville, Virginia.

Weschler was the managing partner of hedge fund Peninsula Capital Advisors which he founded in 1999. Peninsula's $2 billion fund returned 1236% before it was shuttered in 2011.

In July 2010, at $2,626,311, Weschler was the top bidder in a Glide Memorial Church auction to win a private lunch with Warren Buffett. In 2011, Weschler won a second lunch when he upped his bid to $2,626,411. His bids were anonymous until publicly announced by Fortune Magazine in September 2011.

In 2012, Weschler joined Buffett at Berkshire Hathaway, a year after Todd Combs joined as Berkshire's first investment manager. As of 2019, he managed $13 billion of the equity portfolio and $8 billion in pension funds.

Personal Investment Return
According to a public statement issued by Weschler, over the course of 28 years he grew an initial Roth IRA account balance of $70,385 into $131 million. This increase implies a 31% annual return on investment. Such increases were made exclusively through the purchase of publicly available securities and are indicative of long-term market outperformance.

Personal life
Weschler and his wife, Sheila, live in Charlottesville, Virginia with their two daughters, though he sometimes commutes to Omaha, Nebraska for his work at Berkshire Hathaway.

References 

1971 births
American investors
American money managers
Columbia Business School alumni
People from Buffalo, New York
Living people
Florida State University alumni